Rudi Carrell (born Rudolf Wijbrand Kesselaar; 19 December 1934 – 7 July 2006) was a Dutch entertainer. Along with famous entertainers such as Johannes Heesters and Linda de Mol, he was one of the most successful Dutch personalities active in Germany.

He worked as a television entertainer and hosted his own show; the Rudi Carrell Show ran first in the Netherlands, and then for many years in Germany. As a singer he had a number of hits, including a Dutch version of "A Windmill in Old Amsterdam", and acted in several movies.

Eurovision Song Contest
Carrell represented the Netherlands at the Eurovision Song Contest 1960 with the song "Wat een geluk" ("What luck"). He finished 12th out of 13, scoring just two points. He provided the Dutch radio commentary for the 1987 Contest.

Rudi Carrell Show
The Rudi Carrell Show and its successors were a huge success in Germany from the 1960s to the 1990s. The show included a similar concept to Star Search or Pop Idol and brought many well-known German pop stars and actors to prominence, such as Alexis and Mark Keller. It also featured comedy sketches.

His show was also popular in some non-German-speaking European countries, such as Slovenia.

During this time he also hosted other popular shows, including Am laufenden Band, Rudis Tagesshow, Herzblatt, Die verflixte 7, and 7 Tage, 7 Köpfe.

Controversial humor
In 1987, Carrell caused a diplomatic rift between Germany and Iran with a sketch in which veiled women threw their undergarments at someone dressed like Iran's Supreme Leader Ayatollah Khomeini. The Iranian government responded by expelling two German diplomats and permanently closing the Goethe Institute in Tehran.

Death
In an interview in November 2005, Carrell confirmed to the magazine Bunte that he was suffering from lung cancer. He died on 7 July 2006 in Bremen, Germany, aged 71.

Literature

References

External links

 
 a German online book of condolence for Rudi Carell
 Find-a-Grave entry

1934 births
2006 deaths
20th-century Dutch male singers
Dutch male comedians
Dutch male film actors
Eurovision Song Contest entrants for the Netherlands
Eurovision Song Contest entrants of 1960
Dutch game show hosts
Dutch expatriates in Germany
Deaths from lung cancer in Germany
People from Alkmaar
Officers Crosses of the Order of Merit of the Federal Republic of Germany
20th-century comedians
Controversies in the Netherlands
Controversies in Iran
Television controversies in Germany
Political controversies in television
Religious controversies in television
ARD (broadcaster) people
RTL Group people
Radio Bremen people